Knaphoscheid is a village in the commune of Wiltz, in northern Luxembourg. , the village had a population of 171.

Villages in Luxembourg
Wiltz (canton)